The 1906 Costa Rican general election was held during the presidency of Ascensión Esquivel Ibarra. Ibarra openly supported candidate Cleto González Víquez. Other candidates were former president Bernardo Soto Alfaro, former State and Police Secretary Tobías Zúñiga Castro, the also former State Secretary (during Bernardo Soto's administration) Máximo Fernández Alvarado and former justice and Foreign Secretary Ezequiel Gutiérrez Iglesias. Difference were more personal than ideological as all candidates except Gutiérrez were liberals, and the election had a strong "anti-cletista" component. This "anti-cletismo" was what united the opposition and talks about a common joint front occurred but it was not applied. Gutiérrez was candidate of the conservative "Democratic Union", the party that emerged from the now outlawed Catholic Union.

Elections on this period were indirect.  The first round of voters were all male citizens who had an income "according to their social status" and knew how to read and write, which considering that Costa Rica had very high literacy standards for the time and the economic requirement was very ambiguous meant around 60% of the male population could vote. These first level voters choose the Electors who normally had other requirements (particularly, owning properties or having college degrees which meant most of them were middle to high class) and the Electors elected the President, members of Congress and municipal authorities.

Thus, after the first-level election Electors could be pressured into changing the candidate they were supposed to support. After the first round Fernández and Soto endorsed Zuñiga who seem to be the most likely option to defeat González, however, arguing "public order" reasons Ibarra essentially made a crack-down on the opposition declaring martial law and exiling Fernández, Soto and Zuñiga who ended up in New York. After González was proclaimed president they were allowed to come back although Zuñiga retired from politics.

Results
Second grade electors, first round

Second grade electors, second round

References

Elections in Costa Rica
1906 elections in Central America
1906 in Costa Rica